The 1808 Massachusetts gubernatorial election was held on April 4, 1808.

Incumbent Democratic-Republican Governor James Sullivan won re-election to a second term, defeating Federalist nominee Christopher Gore.

General election

Candidates
Christopher Gore, Federalist, incumbent State Senator
James Sullivan, Democratic-Republican, incumbent Governor

Results

References

1808
Massachusetts
Gubernatorial